Radio/Television Skrzyczne Tower (RTON Skrzyczne) is located on the Skrzyczne Mount, Silesian Beskids in Poland, consisting of the 87 metre metal tower and building of the Board of Directors. Coverage of this broadcast station are very considerable, and include the greater part of the Silesian Voivodeship, West of Lesser Poland Voivodeship (including even in City Kraków) and Eastern part Opole Voivodeship, as well as border areas of Slovakia and the Czech Republic. From RTON Skrzyczne analog broadcast are currently four radio stations and digital-3 DVB-T packets. It was founded in 1992, is owned by EmiTel SP. z o.o.

Transmitted programs

FM radio

Digital television MPEG-4

See also

 List of masts

External links
 EmiTel
 Tower in RadioPolska
 DVB-T map in Silesia
 Coverage
1992 establishments in Poland
Bielsko County
Buildings and structures in Silesian Voivodeship
Radio masts and towers in Poland
Towers completed in 1992